Päijät-Häme is a region in Southern Finland south of the lake Päijänne. It borders the regions of Uusimaa, Kanta-Häme, Pirkanmaa, Central Finland, South Savo and Kymenlaakso. The biggest city in the region is Lahti.

Historical provinces

Municipalities 

There are 10 municipalities in Päijät-Häme. Cities and towns are marked in bold.

Lahti Sub-region:
 Asikkala
Population: 
 Hartola (Gustav Adolfs)
Population: 
 Heinola
Population: 
 Hollola
Population: 
 Iitti (Itis)
Population: 
 Kärkölä
Population: 
 Lahti (Lahtis)
Population: 
 Orimattila
Population: 
 Padasjoki
Population: 
 Sysmä
Population: 

Former municipalities:
 Artjärvi (Artsjö)
 Consolidated with the town of Orimattila in 2011.
 Hämeenkoski
 Consolidated with the municipality of Hollola in 2016.
 Heinolan maalaiskunta (Heinola landskommun)
 Consolidated with the town of Heinola in 1997.
 Nastola
 Consolidated with the city of Lahti in 2016.

Until 2021, Iitti was part of the Kymenlaakso region before it became part of Päijät-Häme.

Heraldry 
Blazon: Azure, a mermaid and in dexter chief a cuckoo close Or. In laymen's terms: The coat of arms sports a depiction of the ancient water goddess Vellamo as a mermaid, with a cuckoo.

Politics 
Results of the 2019 Finnish parliamentary election in Päijät-Häme:

Social Democratic Party   23.28%
Finns Party   22.10%
National Coalition Party  19.43%
Centre Party   9.94%
Green League   8.82%
Left Alliance   6.12%
Christian Democrats   6.12%
Movement Now   1.64%
Seven Star Movement   0.40%
Blue Reform   0.38%
Swedish People's Party of Finland   0.29%
Other parties   1.48%

See also 
 Kajaanselkä Basin
 Kymi River
 Lake Vesijärvi

Gallery

References

External links 

The Regional Council of Päijät-Häme

 
Southern Finland Province
Tavastia, Paijanne